Denis E. Lambert (born  c. 1929) is an American former coach athletics coach and administrator.  He served as the athletic director at the University of Vermont from 1973 to 1992.

References

Year of birth missing (living people)
Living people
Vermont Catamounts athletic directors
Vermont Catamounts football coaches
Vermont Catamounts football players
College men's track and field athletes in the United States
College skiing coaches in the United States
High school football coaches in Vermont